Rhopalizus nitens is a species of round-necked longhorn beetles of the subfamily Cerambycinae.

Subspecies
 Rhopalizus nitens clavipes (White, 1853) 
 Rhopalizus nitens houyi  Schmidt, 1922 
 Rhopalizus nitens nigripes (Chevrolat, 1858)

Description
The basic color is blue, with completely black legs in the subspecies Rhopalizus nitens nigripes.

Distribution
This species can be found in Sierra Leone, Liberia, Ivory Coast, Ghana, Togo, Benin, Cameroon, Central Africa, Sudan, Zaire, Equatorial Guinea, Gabon and Democratic Republic of Congo.

References
 Biolib
 nitens Worldwide Cerambycoidea Photo Gallery
 Cerambycoidea Forum

Acanthocinini
Beetles described in 1781